"Work for It" is a song by Chinese singer Jane Zhang. It was released on November 28, 2017, by Montage Records. The lyrics video for "Work for It" was released on December 19, 2017. In November 2017, Jane Zhang performed "Work for It" at the Victoria's Secret Fashion Show in Shanghai along with "Dust My Shoulders Off" and "808."

Track listing

Release history

References

Jane Zhang songs
2017 singles
2017 songs